Manis  is a given name; those bearing it include:

Manis Friedman, dean of the Bais Chana Women International and host of Torah Forum
Manis (Morris) Jacobs, first rabbi of Congregation Shangarai Chasset of New Orleans
Manis Lamond, a striker for the Sydney United Football Club